The Young Wife is a 1984 Australian mini series about young Greeks in Melbourne.

Cast
 Nico Lathouris - Yaumis
 Peter Katsaitis - Criton
 Christine Totos - Anna
 Olivia Hamnett - Patricia Barwing
 Simon Chilvers - Peter Barwing

References

External links

1980s Australian television miniseries
1983 Australian television series debuts
1983 Australian television series endings
Greek-Australian culture in Melbourne
English-language television shows